The 1905 Lafayette football team was an American football team that represented Lafayette College as an independent during the 1905 college football season. In its third season under head coach Alfred E. Bull, the team compiled a 7–2–1 record, shut out seven opponents, and outscored all opponents by a total of 313 to 55. Frank Newberry was the team captain. The team played its home games at March Field in Easton, Pennsylvania.

Schedule

References

Lafayette
Lafayette Leopards football seasons
Lafayette football